The year 1994 is the second year in the history of Pancrase, a mixed martial arts promotion based in the Japan. In 1994 Pancrase held 10 events beginning with, Pancrase: Pancrash! 1.

Title fights

Events list

Pancrase: Pancrash! 1

Pancrase: Pancrash! 1  was an event held on January 19, 1994, at The Yokohama Cultural Gymnasium in Yokohama, Kanagawa, Japan.

Background
In this event, both Bas Rutten and Ken Shamrock lose, their first loss in Pancrase.

Results

Pancrase: Pancrash! 2

Pancrase: Pancrash! 2  was an event held on March 12, 1994, at Aichi Budokan in Nagoya, Aichi, Japan.

Results

Pancrase: Pancrash! 3

Pancrase: Pancrash! 3  was an event held on April 21, 1994, at Osaka Metropolitan Gymnasium in Osaka, Osaka, Japan.

Results

Pancrase: Road to the Championship 1

Pancrase: Road to the Championship 1  was an event held on May 31, 1994, at Nippon Budokan in Tokyo, Japan.

Suzuki v Smith
In the second meeting between Maurice Smith and Minoru Suzuki, both men wore close fisted gloves in the first round. However this was not a kickboxing match as their first had been. This match had the standard Pancrase rule set except for shortened round times and the unique glove rule. In the second round both men fought with no gloves. In the third round they again fought with gloves, where Suzuki won with an armbar. Both men laid in the ring for several minutes after the bout.

Results

Pancrase: Road to the Championship 2

Pancrase: Road to the Championship 2  was an event held on July 6, 1994, at The Amagasaki Gymnasium in Amagasaki, Hyogo, Japan.

Results

Pancrase: Road to the Championship 3

Pancrase: Road to the Championship 3  was an event held on July 26, 1994, at The Komazawa Olympic Gymnasium in Tokyo, Japan.

Results

Pancrase: Road to the Championship 4

Pancrase: Road To The Championship 4  was an event held on September 1, 1994, at The Osaka Metropolitan Gymnasium in Osaka, Osaka, Japan.

Results

Pancrase: Road to the Championship 5

Pancrase: Road to the Championship 5  was an event held on October 15, 1994, at Ryogoku Kokugikan in Tokyo, Japan.

Results

Pancrase: King of Pancrase Tournament Opening Round

Pancrase: King of Pancrase Tournament Opening Round  was an event held on December 16, 1994, at Ryogoku Kokugikan in Tokyo, Japan.

Results

Pancrase: King of Pancrase Tournament Second Round

Pancrase: King of Pancrase Tournament Second Round  was an event held on December 17, 1994, at Ryogoku Kokugikan in Tokyo, Japan.

Results

See also 
 Pancrase
 List of Pancrase champions
 List of Pancrase events

References

Pancrase events
1994 in mixed martial arts